John Morgan (1822–1885) was a British genre artist.

Life

Born in Pentonville, north London, Morgan studied at the School of Design, London and also trained in Paris under Thomas Couture (1815–1879). Whilst living in Aylesbury in 1861, he found fame with his paintings The Jury and The Country Auction.

Career

A member of the Society of British Artists (SBA), his work was influenced by Thomas Webster and William Powell Frith. His son Frederick Morgan was an equally popular artist, most noted for His Turn Next, famously used by the Pears Soap advertising campaign. He died in Hastings.

References

External links
The Jury at Bucks County Museum (about the artist)
The Auction painting
Art by John Morgan (Artnet)
Which hand is it? (painting, 1865)
The Lion and the Lamb (painting, 1861)

1822 births
1885 deaths
19th-century English painters
English male painters
19th-century English male artists